The canton of Ébreuil is a former administrative division in central France. It was disbanded following the French canton reorganisation which came into effect in March 2015. It consisted of 14 communes, which joined the canton of Gannat in 2015. It had 4,601 inhabitants (2012).

The canton comprised the following communes:

Bellenaves
Chirat-l'Église
Chouvigny
Coutansouze
Ébreuil
Échassières
Lalizolle
Louroux-de-Bouble
Nades
Naves
Sussat
Valignat
Veauce
Vicq

Demographics

See also
Cantons of the Allier department

References

Former cantons of Allier
2015 disestablishments in France
States and territories disestablished in 2015